D'Wan Terence Mathis (born July 17, 2000) is an American football quarterback for the Temple Owls. He began his career at Georgia in 2019 and transferred to Temple in 2021.

High school career 
D'Wan attended Oak Park High School in Oak Park, Michigan. He was considered a four-star prospect by many major recruiting sites. In December 2018, Mathis announced his commitment to the University of Georgia. In his senior season he threw for over 1,000 yards and 20 touchdowns.

College career

2019 
During Mathis's freshman year he underwent emergency surgery due to a brain cyst. He subsequently received a medical redshirt.

2020 
After Jake Fromm decided to forgo his senior season to prepare for the NFL Draft and Jamie Newman opted out of the season due to concerns surrounding the COVID-19 pandemic, Mathis was expected to compete for the starting job. He got the start in their opening game at Arkansas. After a disappointing first half, Stetson Bennett came in and took his spot. The next time Mathis got meaningful playing time was against rival Florida. On November 28 Mathis left the team and entered the transfer portal. On December 14 he announced he would be transferring to Temple.

2021 
In his first season with Temple, Mathis was named the day one starter against Rutgers. In the season opener, Mathis went 8 for 24 for 148 yards and one interception in a 61–14 loss. Throughout the season, Mathis would share time with fellow Temple quarterback Justin Lynch. In a game against Memphis, Mathis had a record setting day completing 35 passes for 322 yards and three touchdowns. Mathis finished the season with six touchdowns, 1,223 yards, and 116 completions. During the season it was rumored that Mathis had left the Owl's program but he later publicly announced he would be staying with the team.

College statistics

References

External links
 Georgia Bulldogs bio
 Temple Owls bio

2000 births
Living people
People from Oak Park, Michigan
Sportspeople from Oakland County, Michigan
Players of American football from Michigan
African-American players of American football
American football quarterbacks
Oak Park High School (Michigan) alumni
Georgia Bulldogs football players
Temple Owls football players